The Tagil is a river in Sverdlovsk Oblast, Russia. The river has its sources on the eastern slopes of the Ural Mountains, east of Verkhny Tagil. From there, the Tagil flows north towards Nizhny Tagil, and then in a northeasterly direction to its confluence with the Tura.

The Salda is a southern tributary. A northern tributary, the Barancha, was probably used by Yermak Timofeyevich on his way to capture the Khanate of Sibir.

References

External links 
Information and entertainment portal of Nizhny Tagil 

Rivers of Sverdlovsk Oblast